Solarnia  is a village in the administrative district of Gmina Bierawa, within Kędzierzyn-Koźle County, Opole Voivodeship, in south-western Poland.

The village has a population of 532.

References

Solarnia